Pamięcin may refer to the following places:
Pamięcin, Greater Poland Voivodeship (west-central Poland)
Pamięcin, Lubusz Voivodeship (west Poland)
Pamięcin, West Pomeranian Voivodeship (north-west Poland)